Prospect Hill is a mountain in Greene County, New York. It is located in the Catskill Mountains northwest of Prattsville. Negro Hill is located west-northwest, Dog Hill is located northeast, and Pratt Rocks is located east-southeast of Prospect Hill.

References

Mountains of Greene County, New York
Mountains of New York (state)